GATA transcription factors are a family of transcription factors characterized by their ability to bind to the DNA sequence "GATA".

GATA transcription factors have been correlated to their broader influence on stem cell development. Findings however, have pointed to a more direct influence by GATA transcription factors, as they are salient components in the more concentrated regulation of gene expression. Data points to the roles GATA transcription factors play in stages past early development in endocrine organs.

Despite GATA’s influence on endocrine organs and cell development, they have a complex relation to the development and growth of breast cancer. Its immediate influence is not yet known, its high risk for mutation however, makes determining the immediate influence of paramount importance in battling breast cancer.

Genes
In humans:
 GATA1 (see also )
 GATA2 (see also )
 GATA3 (see also )
 GATA4 (see also )
 GATA5 (see also )
 GATA6 (see also )

In yeast:
 GLN3 (see also GLN3)
 GAT1 (see also GAT1)
 DAL80 (see also DAL80)
 GZF3 (see also GZF3)

Bibliography 

 Viger, Robert S; Guittot, Séverine Mazaud; Anttonen, Mikko; Wilson, David B; Heikinheimo, Markku (2008-04-01). "Role of the GATA Family of Transcription Factors in Endocrine Development, Function, and Disease". Molecular Endocrinology.
 This is a peer reviewed journal that covers the topic and will help establish notability.
 Du, Feng; Yuan, Peng; Wang, Teng; Zhao, Jiuda; Zhao, Zitong; Luo, Yang; Xu, Binghe (2015-11). "The Significance and Therapeutic Potential of GATA3 Expression and Mutation in Breast Cancer: A Systematic Review". Medicinal Research Reviews.
 This is a peer reviewed journal that covers the topic and will help establish notability.

References

External links
 

Transcription factors
Articles containing video clips